The Extraordinary and Plenipotentiary Ambassador of Peru to the Kingdom of Thailand is the official representative of the Republic of Peru to the Kingdom of Thailand.

As of December 2022, the Ambassador is also accredited to Myanmar and the Philippines. The latter's Peruvian embassy closed in 2003.

List of representatives

See also
List of ambassadors of Thailand to Peru
List of ambassadors of Peru to the Philippines

References 

Thailand
Peru